Breakdance or break dance may refer to B-boying, also known as breaking, a style of street dance.

Breakdance may also refer to:

 "Break Dance - Electric Boogie", a 1983 song by West Street Mob
 "Breakdance" (song), a 1984 song by Irene Cara
 Break Dance, a 1984 Commodore 64 game
 Breakdance (ride): a type of amusement park and fairground ride
 Breakin' or Breakdance: The Movie, a 1984 hip-hop dance-thetufhdodmmed film